In Greek mythology, Harmonia (means 'harmony, concord') was a nymph, perhaps a naiad or dryad, in the glens of the Akmonian wood. She was the lover of Ares of whom she bore the warrior-women race of the Amazons.

Notes

References 

 Apollonius Rhodius, Argonautica translated by Robert Cooper Seaton (1853-1915), R. C. Loeb Classical Library Volume 001. London, William Heinemann Ltd, 1912. Online version at the Topos Text Project.
 Apollonius Rhodius, Argonautica. George W. Mooney. London. Longmans, Green. 1912. Greek text available at the Perseus Digital Library.
 Graves, Robert, The Greek Myths, Harmondsworth, London, England, Penguin Books, 1960. 

Nymphs
Women of Ares